Posorites is a genus of air-breathing land snails, terrestrial pulmonate gastropod mollusks in the family Camaenidae.

Species
Species within the genus Posorites include:
 Posorites fucata
 Posorites conscendens
 Posorites turneri

References

 OBIS info

 
Camaenidae
Taxonomy articles created by Polbot